Harriet Persis Hurlbut (February 26, 1862 – ?) was an American artist. Like her father, she was fond of historical and genealogical matters. One of her paintings hangs in the rooms of the Chicago Historical Society, being a portrait of the early explorer, Samuel de Champlain.

Early years and education
Harriet Persis Hurlbut was born in Racine, Wisconsin, February 26, 1862. She was the youngest child and only daughter of Henry Higgins Hurlbut, the author of several works, among them Chicago Antiquities and Hurlbut Genealogy. Through her mother, Harriet Elizabeth Sykes Hurlbut, she traced her ancestry back to four of the Mayflower pilgrims, among them Priscilla Mullins and her husband, John Alden. The line of descent through their daughter, Ruth, included the names of Deacon Samuel Bass, his daughter, Mary Bass Bowditch, Abigail Bowditch, Jeremiah Pratt, and Harriette Partridge Pratt, who married Dr. Royal S. Sykes, of Dorset, Vermont, and was the grandmother of Miss Hurlbut. She had two brothers, Sidney Sykes Hurlbut and Jonathan Henry Hurlbut (died 1871).

With her family, she moved to Chicago in the winter of 1873, and resided in that city ever since. She was graduated from Park Institute, Chicago, it June, 1880. An early fondness for drawing turned her attention to art, and she entered the studio of Professor Peter Baumgras, with whom she pursued her studies in sketching and oil painting almost continuously for eight years.

Career
Her first venture was in connection with Mrs. Mary B. Baumgras. Together, they opened a studio in Chicago. Hurlbut's best known picture was the life-size portrait of Samuel de Champlain, which forms part of the Chicago Historical Society's collection. Always of a serious cast of mind, Hurlbut passed her later years in retirement, with her brother, in the paternal home in Chicago, where she devoted herself to the completion of a family record book, which her father began long before.

References

Attribution

Bibliography

External links
 

1862 births
Artists from Wisconsin
People from Racine, Wisconsin
19th-century American painters
American women painters
Year of death missing
19th-century American women artists